Dichopetala is a genus of short-wing katydids in the family Tettigoniidae. There is one described species in Dichopetala, D. mexicana.

References

Further reading

 

Phaneropterinae
Articles created by Qbugbot
Monotypic Orthoptera genera